RING-box protein 2 is a protein that in humans is encoded by the RNF7 gene.

The protein encoded by this gene is a highly conserved ring finger protein. It is an essential subunit of SKP1-cullin/CDC53-F box protein ubiquitin ligases, which are a part of the protein degradation machinery important for cell cycle progression and signal transduction. This protein interacts with, and is a substrate of, casein kinase II (CSNK2A1/CKII). The phosphorylation of this protein by CSNK2A1 has been shown to promote the degradation of IkappaBalpha (CHUK/IKK-alpha/IKBKA) and p27Kip1(CDKN1B). Alternatively spliced transcript variants encoding distinct isoforms have been reported.

Interactions
RNF7 has been shown to interact with CSNK2B.

See also
 RING finger domain

References

Further reading

External links 
 

RING finger proteins